The 36th Infantry Division (36-ya Pekhotnaya Diviziya) was an infantry formation of the Russian Imperial Army.

Organization
It was part of the 13th Army Corps.
1st Brigade
141st Mozhaysk Infantry Regiment
142nd Zvenigorod Infantry Regiment
2nd Brigade
143rd Dorogobuzh Infantry Regiment
144th Kashira Infantry Regiment
36th Artillery Brigade

References

Infantry divisions of the Russian Empire
Military units and formations disestablished in 1918